Arhopala camdeo, the lilac oakblue, is a butterfly in the family Lycaenidae. It was described by Frederic Moore in 1858. It is found in the Indomalayan realm (Sikkim to Assam, Bhutan, Manipur, Burma, Thailand and Vietnam).

Subspecies
Arhopala camdeo camdeo (India: Sikkim to Assam, Bhutan, Manipur, Burma, Thailand, Vietnam)
Arhopala camdeo sebonga Tytler, 1926 (India)

References

External links
Arhopala Boisduval, 1832 at Markku Savela's Lepidoptera and Some Other Life Forms 

Arhopala
Butterflies described in 1858
Butterflies of Asia
Taxa named by Frederic Moore